Terence William George Lee (20 September 1952 – 22 June 1996) was an English professional footballer who played for Tottenham Hotspur, Torquay United, Newport County and Minehead.

Playing career
Lee emigrated as a child to New Zealand. He started his career as an inside forward and represented North Island against South Island. On his return to the UK he played for Havering and Mid Essex schools before signing as an apprentice with Tottenham Hotspur in April 1968. The club converted him to a goalkeeper and together with teammates including Steve Perryman, Ray Evans and Jimmy Neighbour lifted the London FA Youth Cup. He signed professional forms in May 1970. Lee was a third string goalkeeper behind Pat Jennings and Barry Daines and was limited to one senior appearance against Newcastle United– a 2–0 win for the "Lilies" at St James' Park. In July 1975 he transferred to Torquay United where he featured in 106 matches between 1975 and 1978. Lee signed for Newport County in November 1978, a cartilage injury restricted him to one senior fixture. He went on to play for Minehead where he ended his football career.

Post–football career
At the end of his competitive career, he trained as a chef and settled in Devon. The keen cricketer suffered a fatal heart attack while playing for the Barton Cricket club 2nd XI against Exeter in Torbay on 22 June 1996.

References

External links
Torquay United profile

1952 births
1996 deaths
Footballers from Stepney
English footballers
English Football League players
Association football goalkeepers
Tottenham Hotspur F.C. players
Torquay United F.C. players
Newport County A.F.C. players
Minehead A.F.C. players